Frank Edmund George Pettingell (1 January 1891 – 17 February 1966) was an English actor.

Pettingell was born in Liverpool, Lancashire, and educated at Manchester University. During the First World War he served with the King's Liverpool Regiment.

He appeared in such films as the original version of Gaslight (1940), Kipps (1941 - as Old Kipps), and Becket (1964 - as the Bishop of York). His collection of printed and manuscript playscripts - mostly acquired from the son of the comedian Arthur Williams (1844–1915) - is held at the Templeman Library, University of Kent. He also had an extensive collection of serial fiction and penny-dreadfuls, and this can now be found in the Osborne Collection of Early Children's Books in Toronto.

Collection 
Pettingell was an avid collector of popular playscripts and other literature which range from the 18th century to the early 20th century. In 1966, the Bodleian Library in Oxford purchased Pettingell’s collection of 800 volumes of 19th century ‘penny-dreadful’ publications, many published in parts. Other penny dreadfuls and periodicals from Pettingell's collection were donated to the Osbourne Collection of Early Children's Books in Toronto.

The University of Kent acquired the majority of Pettingell’s collection from his widow, Mrs. Ethel Pettingell, in 1967. The collection comprises some 4,400 printed and manuscript playscripts, with a number of works on the history of the English theatre, which were acquired by Pettingell from Arthur Williams (1844-1915), a popular comedian in the late Victorian and Edwardian theatre. The collection spans a range of popular theatre genres such as melodramas, tragedies, farces, and burlesques. In addition to popular plays, the collection includes over 300 pantomime libretti, ten manuscripts and printed texts of Dion Boucicault’s plays, and a collection of manuscript plays from Hoxton’s Britannia Theatre.

Selected filmography

Jealousy (1931) - Prof. Macguire
Hobson's Choice (1931) - Will Mossup
Frail Women (1932) - The Employer
In a Monastery Garden (1932) - Bertholdi
The Crooked Lady (1932) - Hugh Weldon
Once Bitten (1932) - Sir Timothy Blott
Double Dealing (1932) - Rufus Moon
A Tight Corner (1932) - Oswald Blenkinsop
The Lucky Number (1933) - Mr. Brown
Yes, Madam (1933) - Albert Peabody
The Good Companions (1933) - Sam Oglethorpe
That's My Wife (1933) - Josiah Crump
Excess Baggage (1933) - Gen. Booster, SOS
This Week of Grace (1933) - Mr. Milroy
A Cuckoo in the Nest (1933) - Landlord
Red Wagon (1933) - McGinty
The Medicine Man (1933) - Amos Wells
Keep It Quiet (1934) - Joe Puddlefoot
Sing As We Go (1934) - Uncle Murgatroyd Platt
My Old Dutch (1934) - Uncle Alf
The Big Splash (1935) - Bodkin
The Right Age to Marry (1935) - Lomas
Hope of His Side (1935) - Harry Swan
Say It with Diamonds (1935) - Ezra Hopkins
The Amateur Gentleman (1936) - John Barty
On Top of the World (1936) - Albert Hicks
Fame (1936) - Reuben Pendleton
The Last Journey (1936) - Goddard
Spring Handicap (1937) - Scullion
Take My Tip (1937) - Willis
Millions (1937) - Sir Charles Rimmer
It's a Grand Old World (1937) - Bull
Sailing Along (1938) - Skipper Barnes
So Much to Do (1938, TV Movie) - Kruger
Queer Cargo (1938) - Dan
Return to Yesterday (1940) - Prendergast
Gaslight (1940) - B.G. Rough
Busman's Honeymoon (1940) - Puffett
Kipps (1941) - Old Kipps
This England (1941) - Gage
Once a Crook (1941) - The Captain
Ships with Wings (1941) - Fields
The Seventh Survivor (1942) - Thomas Pettifer
The Goose Steps Out (1942) - Prof. Hoffman
The Young Mr. Pitt (1942) - Coachman
Get Cracking (1943) - Alf Pemberton
The Butler's Dilemma (1943) - (uncredited)
Gaiety George (1946) - Grindley
The Man Who Came to Dinner (1947, TV Movie) - Sheridan Whiteside
Escape (1948) - Constable Beames
No Room at the Inn (1948) - Burrells
The Magic Box (1951) - Bridegroom's Father in Wedding Group
When We Are Married (1951, TV Movie) - Henry Ormonroyd
The Card (1952) - Police Superintendent
The Crimson Pirate (1952) - Colonel
Meet Me Tonight (1952) - Mr. Edwards (segment "Red Peppers")
The Great Game (1953) - Sir Julius
Meet Mr. Lucifer (1953) - Mr. Roberts
Value for Money (1955) - Mayor Higgins
Up the Creek (1958) - Stationmaster
Corridors of Blood (1958) - Mr. Blount
 Charlesworth at Large (1958, TV series) - Horrobin
Coronation Street (1961, TV Series) - Mr. Nugent
Term of Trial (1962) - Ferguson
The Dock Brief (1962) - Tuppy Morgan
Becket (1964) - Bishop of York

References

External links

Frank Pettingell: A chronology
Items from the Pettingell Collection of periodicals and penny dreadfuls held in The Osborne Collection of Early Children's Books at the Public Library of Toronto.

1891 births
1966 deaths
English male film actors
Alumni of the University of Manchester
British Army personnel of World War I
Male actors from Liverpool
King's Regiment (Liverpool) soldiers
20th-century English male actors
Military personnel from Liverpool